Personnel Support Programs (PSP) provides morale and welfare services for Canadian Forces (CF) men and women, and their families. PSP is part of Non Public Funds (NPF), meaning that they don't directly receive tax-payer money.  They are, however, closely related to the publicly funded Department of National Defence.  PSP contributes to the Formation's operational readiness by keeping the CF community fit and healthy in both mind and body.

PSP is involved in every aspect of the CF community member's fitness, sport and recreational activity.

External links
 
 http://www.pspesquimalt.ca

Canadian Armed Forces
Federal departments and agencies of Canada